James Ellis Lander (October 14, 1912 – June 21, 1989) was an American gridiron football player who played Canadian football for the Winnipeg Blue Bombers. He won the Grey Cup with them in 1941.

References

American football quarterbacks
Canadian football quarterbacks
American players of Canadian football
Kansas State Wildcats football players
Winnipeg Blue Bombers players
Players of American football from Kansas
1912 births
1989 deaths